Jajo's Secret is a 2009 made for TV documentary film about the internment of Ukrainians by the government of Canada during the First World War. It was produced and directed by James Motluk (credited as James E Motluk) and broadcast on OMNI TV.

Subject matter 

The movie begins with the discovery by filmmaker Motluk of a parole certificate issued to his late grandfather, Elias, in 1918. Trying to uncover the truth about why the certificate was issued, he begins a journey that is chronicled in the film, first to Sault Ste. Marie, Ontario and then to Ottawa. What he discovers is that the Canadian government created legislation known as The War Measures Act to arrest and intern thousands of Ukrainians whom they perceived as enemy aliens during the war. After the war, these prisoners were paroled and made to work as forced labour in many private Canadian companies on the railroad, in the mines and even building the national park system. Motluk traces his own grandfather to a camp located in the northern Ontario town of Kapuskasing.

Until recently, the Canadian government tried to hide what had happened. During the production of the film, the government finally apologized to the Ukrainian community and agreed to pay restitution.
The title refers to Motluk's grandfather whom he would call Jajo, a child's version of Tato which is Ukrainian for father.

Critical reception

The film has received a lot of praise since its debut on OMNI TV in June 2009. In 2011 it was invited to screen at Columbia University in New York and later at the Ukrainian Museum in Manhattan.

References

2009 television films
2009 films
Canadian documentary television films
2000s Canadian films